C. spilopterus may refer to:

Centropus spilopterus, a cuckoo species
Citharichthys spilopterus, a flatfish species